Preperitoneal packing, also known as preperitoneal pelvic packing, is a treatment option for those with a pelvic fracture who are bleeding and have a low blood pressure. It is recommended when angiographic embolization is not available in a timely manner.

References

Bleeding
Medical dressings